Anime can be viewed on channels such as Animax India, Cartoon Network, Pogo, Toonami, Nickelodeon,  Nickelodeon Sonic, Hungama TV, Disney Channel, Super Hungama, Sony YAY! and Zee Café also broadcasts some form of anime on different times.

Anime is also available on Muse Asia, Muse India and Ani-One Asia YouTube channel as well as streaming platforms such as Netflix, Amazon Prime Video, bilibili, Crunchyroll, Disney+ Hotstar, Voot Kids and Tubi.

Online platforms

Muse Communication

Muse Asia 

 A3!
 A Certain Magical Index III
 A Certain Scientific Accelerator
 Accel World
 Ahiru no Sora
 Alice & Zoroku
 Anne Happy
 Ao-chan Can't Study!
 Apparently, Disillusioned Adventurers Will Save the World
 Argonavis from BanG Dream!
 Arte
 Armor Shop for Ladies & Gentlemen
 Asobi Asobase
 Assassination Classroom
 Asteroid in Love
 Battle Game in 5 Seconds
 BanG Dream!
 Beast Tamer
 Beezlebub
 Black Bullet
 Blast of Tempest
 Bofuri: I Don't Want to Get Hurt, so I'll Max Out My Defense
 Brave Witches
 Burn the Witch
 Campfire Cooking in Another World with My Absurd Skill
 Cautious Hero: The Hero Is Overpowered but Overly Cautious
 Cheer Boys!!
 Classroom of the Elite
 Cop Craft
 Combatants Will Be Dispatched!
 Danganronpa 3: The End of Hope's Peak High School
 Death March to the Parallel World Rhapsody
 Diary of Our Days at the Breakwater
 Dr. Ramune: Mysterious Disease Specialist
 Eagle Talon: Golden Spell
 Encouragement of Climb (season 3)
 EX-ARM
 Fairy Tail (season 9)
 Girls' Last Tour
 Girlfriend, Girlfriend
 Goblin Slayer
 Golden Kamuy
 Hakata Tonkotsu Ramens
 Harukana Receive
 Hand Shakers
 Heaven's Design Team
 Hensuki
 Hetalia World Stars
 Higehiro
 High School Prodigies Have It Easy Even in Another World
 Hina Logi: from Luck & Logic
 Hyouka
 I've Been Killing Slimes for 300 Years and Maxed Out My Level
 I★Chu
 In Search of the Lost Future
 In/Spectre
 Ippon Again!
 Is the Order a Rabbit?
 Isekai Quartet (season 2)
 JoJo's Bizzare Adventure
 Junji Ito Collection
 Kaginado
 Kakuriyo: Bed and Breakfast for Spirits
 Kandagawa Jet Girls
 Kemono Jihen
 Kuma Kuma Kuma Bear
 Kuma Miko: Girl Meets Bear
 Lapis Re:Lights
 Last Period
 Long Riders!
 Lucifer and the Biscuit Hammer
 Luck & Logic
 Luminous Witches
 Made in Abyss
 Magatsu Wahrheit
 Magical Warfare
 Matoi the Sacred Slayer
 Mieruko-chan
 Minami Kamakura High School Girls Cycling Club
 Mob Psycho 100
 Monster Girl Doctor
 Moriarty the Patriot
 Mushoku Tensei
 Muv-Luv Alternative
 Muhyo & Roji's Bureau of Supernatural Investigation (season 2)
 My Next Life as a Villainess: All Routes Lead to Doom!
 My Roomie Is a Dino
 My Roommate Is a Cat
 New Game!
 No Guns Life
 O Maidens in Your Savage Season
 One Punch Man
 Ore, Tsushima
 Outburst Dreamer Boys
 Parallel World Pharmacy
 Phantasy Star Online 2: Episode Oracle
 Phantom in the Twilight
 Police in a Pod
 Pui Pui Molcar
 Rage of Bahamut GENESIS
 Rent-A-Girlfriend
 Re:Zero − Starting Life in Another World
 Riddle Story of Devil
 Rumble Garanndoll
 Sabikui Bisco
 Saiyuki Reload Blast
 Saiyuki Reload: Zeroin
 Scar on the Praeter
 School Babysitters
Selection Project
 Servamp
 Seven Knights Revolution: Hero Successor
 Shachibato! President, It's Time for Battle!
 She Professed Herself Pupil of the Wise Man
 Shikimori's Not Just a Cutie
 Shironeko Project - Zero Chronicle
 Shounen Hollywood
 Skeleton Knight in Another World
 Special 7: Special Crime Investigation Unit
 Spy × Family
 Sugar Apple Fairy Tale
 Super Cub
 Suppose a Kid from the Last Dungeon Boonies Moved to a Starter Town
 Tada Never Falls in Love
 Talentless Nana
 Teasing Master Takagi-san (season 3)
 That Time I Got Reincarnated as a Slime
 The Aquatope on White Sand
 The Case Files of Jeweler Richard
 The Dawn of the Witch
 The Detective Is Already Dead
 The Devil Is a Part-Timer! (season 2)
 The Familiar of Zero
 The Genius Prince's Guide to Raising a Nation Out of Debt
 The God of High School
 The Greatest Demon Lord Is Reborn as a Typical Nobody
 The Helpful Fox Senko-san
 The Magical Revolution of the Reincarnated Princess and the Genius Young Lady
 The Magnificent Kotobuki
 The Ones Within
 The Price of Smiles
 The Ryuo's Work Is Never Done!
 The Saint's Magic Power is Omnipotent
 The Slime Diaries
 The World's Finest Assassin Gets Reincarnated in Another World as an Aristocrat
 This Art Club Has a Problem!
 Tokyo Revengers
 UniteUp!
 Ushio & Tora
 Wandering Witch: The Journey of Elaina
 Wasteful Days of High School Girls
 Welcome to Demon School! Iruma-kun
 Yurikuma Arashi
 Z/X Code Reunion
 Zombie Land Saga Revenge

Muse India 
 Asobi Asobase
 Bofuri: I Don't Want to Get Hurt, So I'll Max Out My Defense
 Classroom of the Elite (season 2)
 Higehiro: After Being Rejected, I Shaved and Took in a High School Runaway
 Is the Order a Rabbit?
 JoJo's Bizarre Adventure
 Kaginado
 Lucifer and the Biscuit Hammer
 Luminous Witches
 Made in Abyss
 Mieruko-chan
 Mob Psycho 100
 My Senpai Is Annoying
 One Punch Man
 Parallel World Pharmacy
 Rent-A-Girlfriend
 Sabikui Bisco
 Shikimori's Not Just a Cutie
 Skeleton Knight in Another World
 Spy × Family
 Tada Never Falls in Love
 That Time I Got Reincarnated as a Slime
 The Dawn of the Witch
 The Devil Is a Part-Timer! (season 2)
 The Greatest Demon Lord Is Reborn as a Typical Nobody
 The World's Finest Assassin Gets Reincarnated in Another World as an Aristocrat
 Tokyo Revengers

Muse Wonderland 
 Pui Pui Molcar

Ani-One Asia

 Akashic Records of Bastard Magic Instructor
Backflip!!
 Black Summoner
 Blood Lad
 Code Geass: Lelouch of the Rebellion
 D4DJ First Mix
 Deaimon
 Don't Hurt Me, My Healer!
 Don't Toy with Me, Miss Nagatoro
 Grand Blues!
 Haikyu
 Harem in the Labyrinth of Another World
 Higurashi: When They Cry GOU
 Hinako Note
 I'm Quitting Heroing: Next Gig Is at the Demon Queen's Castle
 I'm Standing on a Million Lives
 If Her Flag Breaks
 iii icecrin
 Infinite Dendrogram
 Iwakakeru! - Sports Climbing Girls
 Katana Maidens
 KonoSuba-God's blessing on this wonderful world!!
 Life with an Ordinary Guy who Reincarnated into a Total Fantasy Knockout
 Lord Marksman and Vanadis
 Love All Play
 Miss Kuroitsu from the Monster Development Department
 My Isekai Life
 My Stepmom's Daughter Is My Ex
 No Game No Life
 Orient
 Overlord
 Otherside Picnic
 Princess Principal
 Requiem of the Rose King
 Sasaki and Miyano
 SCARLET NEXUS
 SHOW BY ROCK!! STARS!
 Skate-Leading Stars
 So I'm a Spider, So What?
 Super Lovers
 The Maid I Hired Recently Is Mysterious
 The Millionaire Detective Balance: UNLIMITED
 The Strongest Sage With the Weakest Crest
 The World Ends with You The Animation
 To Your Eternity
 Tokyo Ravens
 Tribe Nine
 Unbreakable Machine Doll
 Yamada-kun and the Seven Witches
 Yashahime: Princess Half-Demon
 Yurei Deco
 Yuru Camp

Netflix

 7 Seeds
 A Corpse is Buried Under Sakurako's Feet
 A Place Further than the Universe
 A.I.C.O. -Incarnation-
 Afro Samurai
 Aggretsuko
 Aggretsuko: We Wish You A Metal Christmas
 Ahiru no Sora
 Ajin: Demi-Human
 Akashic Records of Bastard Magic Instructor
 Alice & Zoroku
 Another
 Armed Girl's Machiavellism
 Assassination Classroom
 B The Beginning
 Back Street Girls: Gokudols
 Baki
 Basilisk: The Ouka Ninja Scrolls
 BEASTARS
 Beyblade Burst
 Black Clover
 Black Lagoon
 Bloom Into You
 BNA: Brand New Animal
 Bungo Stray Dogs
 Cannon Busters
 Cardcaptor Sakura
 Carole & Tuesday
 Case Closed
 Cautious Hero: The Hero Is Overpowered but Overly Cautious
 Cells at Work!
 Children of the Whales
 Citrus
 Classroom of the Elite
 Code Geass: Lelouch of the Rebellion
 Cyborg 009 VS Devilman
 Cyborg 009: Call of Justice
 Danganronpa 3: The End of Hope's Peak High School
 Danganronpa: The Animation
 Deadman Wonderland
 Death Note
 Demon Slayer: Kimetsu no Yaiba
 Den-noh Coil
 Devilman Crybaby
 Devils' Line
 Doreiku: The Animation
 Dorohedoro
 Dr. Stone
 Dragon Pilot: Hisone and Masotan
 Durarara!!
 Ergo Proxy
 Fairy Gone
 Fairy Tail
 Fate/Apocrypha
 Fate/Extra Last Encore
 Fate/stay night: Unlimited Blade Works
 Fate/Zero
 Food Wars!: Shokugeki no Soma
 Forest of Piano
 Free!
 Fruits Basket
 Fullmetal Alchemist
 Fullmetal Alchemist: Brotherhood
 Future Diary
 Gantz
 Gate
 Goblin Slayer
 God Eater
 Gosick
 Great Pretender
 Grimgar
 Guilty Crown
 Gunslinger Girl
 Haganai
 Haikyu!!
 Haikyu!! the Movie: Ending and Beginning
 Haikyu!! the Movie: Winners and Losers
 Hakyu Hoshin Engi
 Hanebado!
 Hellsing
 Hellsing Ultimate
 Hero Mask
 Hi Score Girl
 High School DxD
 How Not to Summon a Demon Lord
 Hunter × Hunter (2011)
 ID-0
 In Another World With My Smartphone
 Inazuma Eleven
 Ingress: The Animation
 Is This a Zombie?
 Japan Sinks
 Jojo's Bizarre Adventure
 Juni Taisen: Zodiac War
 K
 Kabaneri of the Iron Fortress
 Kabaneri of the Iron Fortress: The Battle of Unato
 Kakegurui
 Kemono Jihen
 Kengan Ashura
 Jujutsu Kaisen
 Kingdom
 Kino's Journey
 Komi Can't Communicate
 KonoSuba: God's Blessing on This Wonderful World!
 Kotaro Lives Alone
 Kuromukuro
 Kuroko's Basketball
 Last Hope
 Little Witch Academia
 Lost Song
 Lostorage WIXOSS
 Love & Lies
 Magi: Adventure of Sinbad
 Magi: The Labyrinth of Magic
 Maoyu
 Marchen Madchen
 Megalobox
 Mob Psycho 100
 Mobile Suit Gundam Unicorn
 Mobile Suit Gundam: Iron-Blooded Orphans
 My First Girlfriend is a Gal
 My Hero Academia
 Naruto
 Neon Genesis Evangelion
 No Game No Life
 One-Punch Man
 Overlord
Paprika (2006 film)
 Pokémon films
 Pokémon: Mewtwo Strikes Back—Evolution
 Pokémon the Movie: Secrets of the Jungle
 Rage of Bahamut: Genesis
 Re:Zero − Starting Life in Another World
 revisions
 Rilakkuma and Kaoru
 Rock Lee
 Rosario + Vampire
 Run with the Wind
 Rurouni Kenshin
 Saga of Tanya the Evil
 Saint Seiya: Knights of the Zodiac
 Saint Seiya: The Lost Canvas
 Saiyuki Reload Blast
 Samurai 7
 Scum's Wish
 Seis Manos
 Spy x Family
 Seraph of the End
 Shirobako
 Sirius the Jaeger
 Slow Start
 So I'm a Spider, So What?
 Spice and Wolf
 Stand by Me Doraemon 2
 Steins;Gate
 Sword Art Online
 Sword Art Online Alternative Gun Gale Online
 Swordgai: The Animation
 Terraformars
 That Time I Got Reincarnated as a Slime
 The Daily Life of the Immortal King
 The Future Diary
 The Disastrous Life of Saiki K.
 The Disastrous Life of Saiki K.: Reawakaned
 The Way of the Househusband
 The Melancholy of Haruhi Suzumiya
 The Melancholy of Haruhi Suzumiya (2009)
 The Royal Tutor
 The Ryuo's Work Is Never Done!
 The Seven Deadly Sins
 Tokyo Ghoul
 Toradora!
 Trigun
 Twin Star Exorcists
 Ultraman
 Ultramarine Magmell
 Uma Musume Pretty Derby
 Ushio & Tora
 UzaMaid!
 Violet Evergarden
 Violet Evergarden Special
 When They Cry
 WorldEnd
 Yo-Kai Watch
 Yowamushi Pedal
 Yu Yu Hakusho
 Yuuna and the Haunted Hot Springs
 Zombie Land Saga

Amazon Prime Video 

 After the Rain
 Altair: A Record of Battles
 Babylon
 Banana Fish
 Battery: The Animation
 Beatless
 Blade of the Immortal
 Boarding School Juliet
 Dive!!
 Dororo
 Dropkick on My Devil!
 Rebuild of Evangelion
 Evangelion: 1.0 You Are (Not) Alone
 Evangelion: 2.0 You Can (Not) Advance
 Evangelion: 3.0 You Can (Not) Redo
 Evangelion: 3.0+1.0 Thrice Upon a Time
 Grand Blue Dreaming
 Happy Sugar Life
 Inuyashiki Last Hero
 Iroduku: The World in Colors
 Jujutsu Kaisen 0
 Kabaneri of the Iron Fortress
 Karakuri Circus
 Kemurikusa
 Killing Bites
 Kokkoku
 Magical Girl Site
 Onihei
 Psycho-Pass 3
 Rage of Bahamut: Virgin Soul
 Re:Creators
 Saekano: How to Raise a Boring Girlfriend
 Scum's Wish
 Seven Senses of the Reunion
 Shaolin Wuzang
 The Great Passage
 Vinland Saga
 ViVid Strike!
 Welcome to the Ballroom
 Wotakoi: Love is Hard for Otaku
 Yuki Yuna is a Hero: Hero Chapter
 Yuki Yuna is a Hero: Washio Sumi Chapter

bilibili 

 Azur Lane
 Banished from the Hero's Party, I Decided to Live a Quiet Life in the Countryside
 Battle Athletes Victory ReSTART!
 Bleach (TV series)
 Bloom Into You
 Chio's School Road
 Detective Conan
 Dragon Goes House-Hunting
 Giant Beasts of Ars
 Isekai Izakaya: Japanese Food From Another World
 Kageki Shojo!!
 Kagewani
 Kagewani Shō
 Koikimo
 Life Lessons with Uramichi Oniisan
 MARS RED
 Pretty Boy Detective Club
 Remake Our Life!
 Sakugan
 Science Fell in Love, So I Tried to Prove It
 Seirei Gensouki: Spirit Chronicles
 Spy Classroom
 Suzakinishi the Animation
 Teach Me, Hokusai!
 The 8th Son? Are You Kidding Me?
 The Dungeon of Black Company
 Uzaki-chan Wants to Hang Out!

Crunchyroll 

 11eyes: Tsumi to Batsu to Aganai no Shōjo
 A Couple of Cuckoos
 Adachi and Shimamura
 Afro Samurai: Resurrection
 After School Dice Club
 Ai Tenchi Muyo!
 Ai-Mai-Mi
 Aiura
 Akebi's Sailor Uniform
 Akiba Maid War
 Akudama Drive
 Ancient Girl's Frame
 Arknights: Prelude to Dawn
 Assault Lily Bouquet
 Ayakashi Triangle
 Azur Lane
 B Gata H Kei
 Back Arrow
 BanG Dream! Episode of Roselia
 BanG Dream! Film Live 2nd Stage
 BanG Dream! Poppin'Dream!
 Banished from the Hero's Party, I Decided to Live a Quiet Life in the Countryside
 Barakamon
 Basilisk (season 1)
 Battle Athletes Victory ReSTART!
 Battle Girls: Time Paradox
 Berserk: The Golden Age Arc - Memorial Edition 
 Bikini Warriors
 Black Cat
 Blassreiter
 Bloodivores
 Blue Reflection Ray
 Bocchi the Rock!
 Boruto: Naruto Next Generations
 Bottom-tier Character Tomozaki
 Buddy Daddies
 Build Divide
 Burst Angel
 C3
 Cardfight!! Vanguard
 Chainsaw man
 Cheating Craft
 Chillin' in My 30s After Getting Fired from the Demon King's Army
 Chitose Get You!!
 Chronos Ruler
 Code Geass
 Comic Party Revolution
 Corpse Princess
 Crossing Time
 D4DJ All Mix
 D4DJ First Mix
 Danchigai''''
 Darling in the Franxx Date A Live (season 4) Deaimon Deep Insanity: The Lost Child Demon King Daimao Demon Slayer: Kimetsu no Yaiba (season 2) Desert Punk Do It Yourself!! Don't Hurt Me, My Healer! Eden of the East Engage Kiss Estab Life: Great Escape Excel Saga Eyeshield 21 Fanfare of Adolescence Fantasia Sango Fate/Grand Carnivall FairyTail Fire Force Folktales from Japan Fruits Basket (2001) Future Card Buddyfight Fuuto PI Gakuen Handsome Gankutsuou: The Count of Monte Cristo Garo: Vanishing Line gdgd Fairies Gekidol Girls' Frontline Gleipnir Gun Sword Hanabi-chan Is Often Late Handyman Saitō in Another World Happiness! Heat Guy J Heroines Run the Show High Card Hitori no Shita: The Outcast Horimiya Hortensia Saga Hoshizora e Kakaru Hashi How to Keep a Mummy I Can't Understand What My Husband Is Saying I'm Kodama Kawashiri If My Favorite Pop Idol Made It to the Budokan, I Would Die In the Heart of Kunoichi Tsubaki Inferno Cop Inugami-san to Nekoyama-san Isekai Quartet The Movie -Another World- Ixion Saga DT Jinsei JoJo's Bizarre Adventure (seasons 1-2)
 Joshi Kausei Jujutsu Kaisen 0 Kaguya-sama: Love Is War (seasons 2-3)
 Kakushigoto KanColle (season 2)
 Karneval Kaze no Stigma Kiddy Grade Kimi to Boku King of Thorn Kingdom (seasons 3-4)
 Kochoki Koihime Musō Kono Aozora ni Yakusoku o Laid-Back Camp (season 1) Last Exile Laughing Under the Clouds LBX Girls Legend of Mana: The Teardrop Crystal Listeners Log Horizon The Case Files of Lord El-Melloi II (special)
 Love After World Domination Love All Play Lycoris Recoil Magia Record Magical Girl Ore Magical Girl Raising Project Magikano Mahjong Soul Pong Makai Senki Disgaea Malevolent Spirits Miritari! Mieruko-chan Million Arthur Miss Caretaker of Sunohara-sou Miss Kuroitsu from the Monster Development Department Miss Monochrome Miss Shachiku and the Little Baby Ghost Mobile Suit Gundam: Char's Counterattack Mobile Suit Gundam: The Witch From Mercury Mobile Suit Gundam 00 the Movie: A Wakening of the Trailblazer Mobile Suit Gundam ZZ Monster Strike Monster Strike The Movie More Than a Married Couple, But Not Lovers Morita-san wa Mukuchi Mushibugyō Muteking the Dancing Hero Muv-Luv Alternative: Total Eclipse 
 My Dress-Up Darling My Stepmom's Daughter Is My Ex My Wife is the Student Council President Naruto SD: Rock Lee & His Ninja Pals Naruto Shippuden Nekopara Neo Angelique Abyss Nier: Automata Ver1.1a Noblesse 
 Noblesse: Awakening Nobunaga Teacher's Young Bride Nobunagun Noir Number24 Nyaruko: Crawling with Love Oneechan ga Kita One Punch Man Origin: Spirits of the Past Otogi-Jūshi Akazukin Over Drive Girl 1/6 Parallel World Pharmacy Peacemaker Kurogane Play It Cool, Guys Police in a Pod Pop Team Epic (season 1, English dub-only)
 Poyopoyo Kansatsu Nikki Prétear Princess Jellyfish Pumpkin Scissors PuraOre! Pride of Orange Radiant Ragnarok the Animation Rainy Cocoa side G 
 Ranking of Kings Raven of the Inner Palace Reborn to Master the Blade: From Hero-King to Extraordinary Squire Recorder and Randsell Recovery of an MMO Junkie ReLIFE 'Rent a girlfriend
 Revenger
 Robotech
 Robotech II: The Sentinels
 Robotech: The Shadow Chronicles
 Robotics;Notes
 Romeo × Juliet
 RPG Real Estate
 Rumble Garanndoll
 Rumbling Hearts
 Rusted Armors
 Saiyuki Reload
 Saiyuki Reload Gunlock
 Saiyuki Reload Blast
 Saki
 Sakura Wars the Animation
 Salaryman's Club
 Samurai Champloo
 Sasaki and Miyano
 Sasami: Magical Girls Club
 Saving 80,000 Gold in Another World for My Retirement
 School Days
 Selection Project
 Sengoku Basara: End of Judgement
 Sengoku Collection
 Senran Kaguya Shinovi Master
 Seton Academy: Join the Pack!
 Senyu
 Shadows House
 Shangri-La
 She Professed Herself Pupil of the Wise Man
 Shenmue: The Animation
 Shigurui
 Shinobi no Ittoki
 Shirokuma Cafe
 Shugo Chara!
 SK8 the Infinity
 Sket Dance
 Slow Loop
 Smile Down the Runway
 SoltyRei
 Sorcerous Stabber Orphen
 Soul Buster
 Sparrow's Hotel
 Speed Grapher
 Spy x family
 SSSS.Dynazenon
 SSSS.Gridman
 Stand My Heroes: Piece of Truth
 Starlight Promises
 Stars Align
 Straight Title Robot Anime
 Strange+
 Strike Witches (season 1)
 Sugar Apple Fairy Tale
 Taisho Otome Fairy Tale
 Tales of Luminaria: The Fateful Crossroad
 Tamayomi
 Tenchi Muyo! War on Geminar
 Teppen—!!!
 Terra Formars
 Tesla Note
 The Ambition of Oda Nobuna
[[That Time I Got Reincarnated as a Slime]
 The Ancient Magus' Bride The Angel Next Door Spoils Me Rotten The Case Study of Vanitas The Detective Is Already Dead The Duke of Death and His Maid The Galaxy Railways The Genius Prince's Guide to Raising a Nation Out of Debt The Heike Story The Honor at Magic High School The Ice Guy and His Cool Female Colleague The Iceblade Sorcerer Shall Rule the World The Idolmaster Cinderella Girls Theater The Irregular at Magic High School (Reminiscence Arc)
 The Journey The Legend of Heroes: Trails of Cold Steel – Northern War The Magical Revolution of the Reincarnated Princess and the Genius Young Lady The Misfit of Demon King Academy (season 2)
 The Millionaire Detective Balance: Unlimited The Prince of Tennis The Promised Neverland (season 2) 
 The Reincarnation of the Strongest Exorcist in Another World The Tale of Outcasts The Tower of Druaga The World Is Still Beautiful Time of Eve Trapped in a Dating Sim: The World of Otome Games is Tough for Mobs To Be Hero Toilet-Bound Hanako-kun Tokyo 24th Ward Tomo-chan is a Girl! Tower of God Trigun Stampede Ulysses: Jeanne d'Arc and the Alchemist Knight UniteUp! Unlimited Psychic Squad Utawarerumono Vandread Venus Project: Climax Vinland Saga Vivy: Fluorite Eye's Song Wagamama High Spec Wakakozake Walkure Romanze Wanna Be the Strongest in the World Wave, Listen to Me! Welcome to the N.H.K. Wonder Egg Priority Wonder Momo World War Blue World Fool News Yatogame-chan Kansatsu Nikki (season 4)
 Yurumates YuruYuri Disney+ Hotstar 

 Aoashi Black Rock Shooter: Dawn Fall Dance Dance Danseur Doraemon Dr. Stone: Ryusui Overlord IV Platinum End Shin-chan Star Wars: Visions Summer Time Rendering The Faraway Paladin The Tatami Time Machine Blues Tomodachi GameRooster Teeth
 RWBY: Ice Queendom NHK World-Japan 

 Animation × Paralympic: Who Is Your Hero? Kiyo in Kyoto: From the Maiko House Voot Kids 

 Iron Man Pokémon Pokémon Movie: Mewtwo ka Badla Pokémon Movie: Ash, Pikachu aur Lugia in Danger Pokémon Movie: Unown ka Tahelka Pokémon Movie: Khatre ka Jungle Pokémon Movie: Soul Dew ka Raaz: Latias aur Latios Pokémon Movie: Jirachi ka Wonder Pokémon Movie: Deoxy aur Tory ki Story Pokémon Movie: Lucario ki Toofani Pokémon Movie: Darkrai Dost ya Dushman Pokémon Movie: Giratina aur ek Maha Yoddha Pokémon Movie: Arceus aur Jeevan ka Jewel Pokémon Movie: Zoroark Mayajaal Ka Ustaad Pokémon Movie: Victini Aur Reshiram Pokémon Movie: Kyurem Ka Muqabla Pokémon Movie: Mewtwo Aur Genesect Ek Shaandar Kahani Pokémon Movie Dabang Diancie Aur Diamond Pokémon the Movie: Hoopa and the Clash of Ages Pokémon the Movie: Volcanion And The Mechanical Marvel Pokémon the Movie: I Choose You Pokémon the Movie: The Power of Us Wolverine Tubi 

 Toriko Alka r-16 Virgin mission Future Card Buddyfight Yukizake mave chan Jin roh Ex driver the Movie Saint seiya santai sho Sola Gene shaft Yukikaze Ex drive Dady long legs Alien nine Bananya Angel santuary Stratos 4 The daichis Blue submarine no 9 Bubblegum crisis I am gonna be angel Midori Days Junkers come here Earth maiden Arjuna Street fighter: The new challengers Labyrinth of flames Zodiac warriors Vampire princess miyu Vampire princess miyu vol 2  Gogo football  Melty lancer Pokémon Asia Channels 

 Theatrical releases 

 TV channels 
 Animax India Air GearAkiraAngel TalesAppleseedAsobotto Senki GokuAssassination ClassroomBaccano!Big Windup!Black CatBleachBlood The Last VampireBuso RenkinCaptain TsubasaCaptain Tsubasa Road to 2002Cardcaptor SakuraLe Chevalier D'EonChobitsLa Corda D'Oro: Primo PassoCowboy BebopCyborg Kuro-chanDaa! Daa! Daa!Danball SenkiDanball Senki WarsDanball Senki WDNA²Dragon BallEmma - A Victorian RomanceEmma - A Victorian Romance: Second ActEscaflowne: The MovieEureka SevenFairy TailFantastic ChildrenFate/stay nightFinal Fantasy VII Advent ChildrenFinal Fantasy: UnlimitedFlame of ReccaFullmetal AlchemistFullmetal Alchemist: BrotherhoodFushigi YugiFushigi Yugi EikodenGakuen AliceGalaxy AngelGalaxy Angel AGalaxy Angel RuneGalaxy Angel XGalaxy Angel ZGankutsuou: The Count of Monte CristoGegege no Kitarō (TV 4/1996)GetbackersGhost in the ShellGhost in the Shell 2: InnocenceGhost in the Shell: Stand Alone ComplexGhost in the Shell: Stand Alone Complex 2nd GIGGhost Slayers AyashiGlass FleetGunslinger GirlGurren Lagann.hack//Legend of the Twilight.hack//Roots.hack//SignHayate the Combat ButlerHayate the Combat Butler!!Hell GirlHell Girl: Three VesselsHell Girl: Two MirrorsHellsing UltimateHoney and CloverHoney and Clover IIHoop DaysIdaten JumpInitial DInitial D: Second StageInuyashaInuYasha: The Final ActInuyasha the Movie: The Castle Beyond the Looking GlassInuYasha the Movie: Swords of an Honorable RulerInuyasha the Movie: Fire on the Mystic IslandInuyasha the Movie: Affections Touching Across TimeJubei-Chan: The Ninja Girl - Secret of the Lovely EyepatchK-ON!Kaze no StigmaKekkaishiKyo kara Maoh!Living for the Day After TomorrowLove, Chunibyo & Other Delusions!MagikanoMaid Sama!Maria Watches Over UsMidori DaysMobile Suit Gundam SeedMobile Suit Gundam ZZMushibugyoNisekoi Nisekoi:Nodame CantabileOne Punch ManOrigin: Spirits of the Past Paradise KissPilot CandidatePlay BallPlease Teacher!Pumpkin ScissorsR.O.D The TVRanma ½ Read or DieRomeo × JulietRurouni Kenshin: ReflectionSaber Marionette JSaber Marionette J to XSaiyuki ReloadSaiyuki Reload GunlockSamurai ChamplooServampSgt. FrogShakugan no Shana SecondSlam DunkSolty ReiSpace DandySquid GirlTears to TiaraThe Prince of TennisThe Story of SaiunkokuThe Story of Saiunkoku: Second SeriesThe World God Only KnowsTokyo RavensToward the TerraTrinity BloodTsubasa RESERVoir CHRoNiCLETweeny WitchesUltra ManiacUrusei YatsuraWelcome to the NHKWitch Hunter RobinWolf's RainYu Yu HakushoYakitate!! JapanYōkai Ningen BemZettai Shonen Cartoon Network 

 Bakugan Battle Brawlers Bakugan Battle Brawlers: New Vestroia Battle B-Daman Beyblade Blue Dragon Bobobo-bo Bo-bobo Capeta Captor Sakura Digimon Digimon Adventure 
 Dragon Ball Dragon Ball Z Dragon Ball Super Duel Masters Gon Heidi Hi Hi Puffy AmiYumiInazuma Eleven Kaiketsu Zorori Kamen Rider Agito Kiteretsu Kiba Kirby: Right Back at Ya!
 The Legend of Snow White Hikari Sentai Maskman Mix Master Mobile Suit Gundam Naruto Ninja Robots One Piece PokémonPokémon: The First MoviePokémon: The Movie 2000 Pokémon 3: The Movie - Spell of the UnownPokémon 4Ever: Celebi - Voice of the ForestPokémon Heroes: Latios and Latias Pokémon: Jirachi—Wish MakerPokémon: Destiny DeoxysPokémon: Lucario and the Mystery of MewPokémon Ranger and the Temple of the SeaPokémon: The Rise of Darkrai Powerpuff Girls Z Sonic X Super Shiro Transformers: Armada Transformers: Energon Transformers: Cybertron Transformers: Robots in Disguise Trouble Chocolate Ultimate Muscle Zatch Bell! Pogo 

 Anpanman Astro Boy Gon Hagemaru Kimba the White Lion Kirby: Right Back at Ya! Kiteretsu Mirmo! Mojacko My Three Daughters Ninja Boy Obocchama Kun Pokémon Scan2Go The Genie Family The Gutsy Frog The Jungle Book The Monster Kid Wonder Bevil Yo-Kai Watch Toonami 

 Beyblade BeyWarriors: Cyborg Beyblade: Metal Fusion Cardcaptor Sakura Digimon Deltora Quest Dragon Ball Z Dragon Ball Z Kai Dragon Ball Super Dragon Ball GT Duel Masters Gaist Crusher My Hero Academia Pokémon Yu-Gi-Oh Nickelodeon 

 Atashin'chi Chibi Maruko-chan Idaten Jump Jankenman Mighty Cat Masked Niyander Ninja Hattori Perman Nickelodeon Sonic 

 Blackie The Funny Dog Digimon Xros Wars Dinosaur King Ginga Densetsu Weed Ghosts At School Idaten Jump Kickers Mighty Cat Masked Niyander Monsuno Ninja Hattori Ninja Hattori: Home Town Ninja Hattori: Picture Diary Naruto Spin-Off: Rock Lee & His Ninja Pals Perman Ultraman Mebius Zatchbell Hungama TV 

 AM Driver Asari-chan B-Daman Crossfire Beyblade Beyblade The Movie: Ek Bhayankar Yudh Blacky the Funny DogChimpui Detective Conan Digimon Xros Wars DoraemonDoraemon in Nobita's Little Space WarDoraemon in Nobita's GreatAdventure to the South SeasDoraemon The Movie Nobita's DinosaurDoraemon in Nobita and the Steel Troops-The New AgeDoraemon The Movie Nobita's Dorabian NightsDoraemon The Movie Nobita's Three Little SwordsmenDoraemon The Movie Nobita Aur Jadooi TapuDoraemon The Movie Khel Khilona Bhool BhulaiyaDoraemon The Movie Nobita in Jannat No.1Doraemon The Movie Yeh Bhi Tha Nobita Woh Bhi Tha NobitaDoraemon The Movie Jadoo Mantar Aur JahnoomDoraemon The Movie Nobita The Explorer Bow! Bow!Doraemon and Adventures of Koya Koya PlanetDoraemon The Movie Galaxy Super ExpressDoraemon The Movie Toofani AdventureDoraemon The Movie: Gadget Museum Ka RahasyaDoraemon The Movie: Stand by MeDoraemon Nobita Bana SuperheroDoraemon Nobita in Ichi Mera DostDoraemon Nobita Ki Nayi DuniyaDoraemon Nobita In Hara Hara PlanetDoraemon Nobita Aur Ek JalpariDoraemon Nobita And Jangal Mai DangalDoraemon Nobita Ki Universe YatraDoraemon Nobita Aur Antariksh DakuDoraemon Nobita And The Kingdom Of Robot SinghamDoraemon Nobita Aur Birdopia Ka SultanDoraemon The Movie Nobita in Gol Gol GolmaalDoraemon Movie Dinosaur YoddhaDoraemon: The Movie Nobita and the Birth of JapanDoraemon The: Movie Underwater AdventureDoraemon The Movie: Nobita Chal Pada AntarcticaDoraemon The Movie: Nobita's Treasure IslandDoraemon The Movie: Nobita Chala Chand Pe Gigant Big Shot Tsukasa Hagemaru Kiteretsu 
 KochiKame Lucky Man Little Moonlight Rider Magical Hat Monster Kid Nintama Rantarō 
 Ojarumaru Osomatsu-kun Guzura Perman 
 Pokémon Pokémon Movie: Mewtwo ka Badla Pokémon Movie: Ash, Pikachu aur Lugia in Danger Pokémon Movie: Unown ka Tahelka Pokémon Movie: Khatre ka Jungle Pokémon Movie: Soul Dew ka Raaz: Latias aur Latios Pokémon Movie: Jirachi ka Wonder Pokémon Movie: Deoxy aur Tory ki Story Pokémon Movie: Lucario ki Toofani Pokémon Movie: Darkrai Dost ya Dushman Pokémon Movie: Giratina aur ek Maha Yoddha Pokémon Movie: Arceus aur Jeevan ka Jewel Pokémon Movie: Zoroark Mayajaal Ka Ustaad Pokémon Movie: Victini Aur Reshiram Pokémon Movie: Kyurem Ka Muqabla Pokémon Movie: Mewtwo Aur Genesect Ek Shaandar Kahani Pokémon Movie: Hoopa And The Magic Ring Pokémon Movie: Volcanion Ki Kahani Pokémon Movie: Aap Selected Ho! Robotan ShinChan Treasures of the Buri Buri KingdomShin Chan in Action Kamen vs Higure RakshasShinchan: Bungle in the JungleShin Chan Movie: Adventures In HenderlandShin Chan in Dark Tama Tama Thrilling ChaseShin Chan Movie: The Golden SwordShin Chan Movie The SpyShin Chan The Movie Villain aur DulhanShin Chan The Movie Himawari Banegi RajkumariShin Chan Masala Story The MovieShin Chan in Very Very Tasty TastyShin Chan Movie: Robot DadShin Chan Movie: Kaanta Lagaa Sonic X Tamagon the Counselor Tensai Bakabon The Genie Family The Gutsy Frog Ultra B Yu-Gi-Oh! Zenmai Zamurai Disney Channel DoraemonDoraemon in Nobita's Little Space WarDoraemon in Nobita's Great Adventure to the South SeasDoraemon The Movie Nobita's DinosaurDoraemon in Nobita and the Steel Troops-The New AgeDoraemon The Movie Nobita's Dorabian NightsDoraemon The Movie Nobita's Three Little SwordsmenDoraemon The Movie Nobita Aur Jadooi TapuDoraemon The Movie Khel Khilona Bhool BhulaiyaDoraemon The Movie Nobita in Jannat No.1Doraemon The Movie Yeh Bhi Tha Nobita Woh Bhi Tha NobitaDoraemon The Movie Jadoo Mantar Aur JahnoomDoraemon The Movie Nobita The Explorer Bow! Bow!Doraemon and Adventures of Koya Koya PlanetDoraemon The Movie Galaxy Super ExpressDoraemon The Movie Toofani AdventureDoraemon The Movie: Gadget Museum Ka RahasyaDoraemon The Movie: Stand by MeDoraemon Nobita Bana SuperheroDoraemon Nobita in Ichi Mera DostDoraemon Nobita Ki Nayi DuniyaDoraemon Nobita In Hara Hara PlanetDoraemon Nobita Aur Ek JalpariDoraemon Nobita And Jangal Mai DangalDoraemon Nobita Ki Universe YatraDoraemon Nobita Aur Antariksh DakuDoraemon Nobita And The Kingdom Of Robot SinghamDoraemon Nobita Aur Birdopia Ka SultanDoraemon The Movie Nobita in Gol Gol GolmaalDoraemon Movie Dinosaur YoddhaDoraemon: The Movie Nobita and the Birth of JapanDoraemon The: Movie Underwater Adventure Hamtaro Jewelpet Twinkle Kiteretsu Mermaid Melody Pichi Pichi Pitch Ojamajo Doremi Perman Pokémon Stitch! Super Hungama 

 B-Daman Crossfire Beyblade Beyblade Movie Generation 2 – Metal Fight Gon the Stone Age Boy Heroman Infinity Nado KochiKame Kiteretsu Marvel Disk Wars: The Avengers Marvel Future Avengers Little Moonlight Rider Luckyman Nintama Rantarō One Piece Pokémon Pokémon Movie: Mewtwo ka Badla Pokémon Movie: Ash, Pikachu aur Lugia in Danger Pokémon Movie: Unown ka Tahelka Pokémon Movie: Khatre ka Jungle Pokémon Movie: Soul Dew ka Raaz: Latias aur Latios Pokémon Movie: Jirachi ka Wonder Pokémon Movie: Deoxy aur Tory ki Story Pokémon Movie: Lucario ki Toofani Pokémon Movie: Darkrai Dost ya Dushman Pokémon Movie: Giratina aur ek Maha Yoddha Pokémon Movie: Arceus aur Jeevan ka Jewel Pokémon Movie: Zoroark Mayajaal Ka Ustaad Pokémon Movie: Victini Aur Reshiram Pokémon Movie: Kyurem Ka Muqabla Pokémon Movie: Mewtwo Aur Genesect Ek Shaandar Kahani Pokémon Movie Dabang Diancie Aur Diamond Pokémon the Movie: Hoopa And The Magic Rings Ryukendo Ultra B Disney International HD 

 Pokémon: Diamond and Pearl: Galactic Battles Sony YAY! 

 Naruto Obocchama Kun Robotan Sergeant KeroroZee Café

 Marvel Anime Blade Marvel Anime Iron Man Marvel Anime Wolverine Valkyria Chronicles''

References 

Anime in India
Television in India

Notes